André Binette (December 2, 1933 – August 16, 2004) was a professional ice hockey goaltender who played one game with the Montreal Canadiens in 1954–55, giving up four goals, but winning the game. He was born in  Montreal, Quebec.

Binette was called up to replace Jacques Plante, who was injured in the pre-game warm up.

On August 18, 2004, Binette died from a heart attack while playing tennis with his son.

Career statistics

See also
 List of players who played only one game in the NHL

References

External links
 

1933 births
2004 deaths
Canadian expatriate ice hockey players in the United States
Canadian ice hockey goaltenders
Clinton Comets players
French Quebecers
Ice hockey people from Montreal
Montreal Canadiens players
Shawinigan-Falls Cataracts (QSHL) players
Toledo Mercurys players
Troy Bruins players